Sebastian Cluer is a Canadian film director, producer, developer and writer

Cluer was born and raised in Toronto. He met frequent collaborator Kenny Hotz, six years his senior as a preteen through his father, who bought cannabis off Hotz. He graduated from Ryerson University's New Media program at the School of Image Arts.

Cluer has worked professionally in many genres including Comedy, Drama, Horror, Factual and Documentary. He has worked on shows like Still Standing, Kenny vs. Spenny, My 90-Year-Old Roommate, Decoys, The Ron James Show, My Paranormal Nightmare and Paranormal Nightshift.

Select awards and nominations 

Paranormal Nightshift – Season 1 'She Follows Me'
2021 Canadian Screen Awards – Best Direction, Factual winner (scripted recreation)

Still Standing (Canadian TV series)
2022 World Wide Comedy Awards – Best TV Direction nominee – Season 6
2020 Canadian Screen Awards – Best Direction in a Documentary or Factual Series nominee – Season 5
2019 Canadian Comedy Awards – Best Comedy Director nominee – Season 4
2019 Canadian Screen Awards – Best Factual Series nominee – Season 4
2018 Banff Rockies Program Competition – Best Music, Performance, Arts & Variety Program winner – Season 3
2017 Canadian Screen Awards – Best Direction in a Documentary or Factual Series nominee – Season 2
2017 Canadian Screen Awards – Best Factual Program or Series nominee – Season 2
2016 Canadian Screen Awards – Best Factual Program or Series winner – Season 1
2015 TV Ehwards – The Wayne & Shuster Award for Best Canadian Sketch Comedy Series winner – Season 1

Kenny vs. Spenny
2011 Canadian Comedy Awards – Best Comedy Director nominee – XMas Special
2010 Gemini Awards – Best Ensemble Performance in a Comedy nomination (Kenny Hotz & Spencer Rice) – Season 6
2010 Canadian Comedy Awards – Best Comedy Writing nominee – Season 6
2008 Gemini Awards – Best Comedy Program or Series nominee – Season 4
2006 Gemini Awards – Best Comedy Program or Series nominee – Season 2
2004 Gemini Awards – Best Reality Based Entertainment Program or Series nominee – Season 1
2004 Rose d'Or Lucerne Switzerland – Best Comedy Series nominee – Season 1

My 90-Year-Old Roommate
2019 Canadian Comedy Awards – Best Comedy Director nominee – Season 2
2019 The Indie Screen Awards – Best Comedy Director nominee – Season 2
2019 Banff World Media Festival – Best Web Series Fiction nomination – Season 2

Kenny Hotz's Triumph of the Will – Season 1
2013 Canadian Screen Awards – Best Comedy Program or Series nominee
2013 Canadian Screen Awards – Best Photography in a Comedy Program or Series nomination
2012 Canadian Comedy Awards – Best Comedy Director nominee
2012 Banff Rockie Award at the Banff World Media Festival – Best Comedy Program nominee

The Papal Chase
2005 Canadian Filmmakers' Festival – People's Choice for Best Feature Film Award winner
2005 Brooklyn Film Festival – Audience Choice Award winner
2004 4th annual Whistler Film Festival 2004 – Phillip Borsos Award winner

Million Dollar Critic
2016 Canadian Screen Awards – Best Factual Program or Series nominee

Buy It, Fix It, Sell It
2016 Canadian Screen Awards – Best Lifestyle Program or Series

Holmes Inspection – Season 1
2010 Gemini Awards – Best Lifestyle/Practical Information Series nominee

Restaurant Makeover – Season 5
2009 Gemini Awards – Best Lifestyle/Practical Information Series nominee

References

External links 

People from Toronto
Canadian television directors
Living people
1973 births